Shevir (also Romanized as Shevīr and Shavīr; also known as Chavir and Javīr) is a village in Khorramdarreh Rural District, in the Central District of Khorramdarreh County, Zanjan Province, Iran. At the 2006 census, its population was 1,631, in 305 families.

References 

Populated places in Khorramdarreh County